Gazaria Union is a union of Sakhipur Upazila, Tangail District, Bangladesh. It is situated 44 km east of Tangail, The District Headquarter.

Demographics

According to Population Census 2011 performed by Bangladesh Bureau of Statistics, The total population of Gazaria union is 38120. There are 10884 households in total.

Education

The literacy rate of Gazaria Union is 40.8% (Male-44.8%, Female-37.3%).

See also
 Union Councils of Tangail District

References

Populated places in Dhaka Division
Populated places in Tangail District
Unions of Sakhipur Upazila